The Smurfs (Dutch: De Smurfen) is a Belgian comic series, created by cartoonist Peyo (pen name of Pierre Culliford). The titular creatures were introduced as supporting characters in an already established series, Johan and Peewit in 1958, and starred in their own series from 1959. Thirty-nine Smurf comic albums have been created, 16 of them by Peyo. Originally, the Smurf stories appeared in Spirou magazine with reprints in many different magazines, but after Peyo left the publisher Dupuis, many comics were first published in dedicated Smurf magazines, which existed in French, Dutch and German. A number of short stories and one page gags have been collected in comic books next to the regular series of 39. By 2008, Smurf comics have been translated into 25 languages, and some 25 million albums have been sold.

History

In 1952, Peyo created a series in Spirou magazine titled Johan et Pirlouit (Johan and Peewit), set in Europe during the Middle Ages. Johan serves as a brave young page to the king, and Pirlouit (pronounced Peer-loo-ee) functions as his faithful, if boastful and cheating, midget sidekick.

On 23 October 1958, Peyo introduced a new set of characters to the Johan et Pirlouit story La flûte à six trous (tr. "The Flute with Six Holes"). This alone caused no great excitement, as the brave duo constantly encountered strange new people and places. This time, they had the mission of recovering a magic flute, which required some sorcery by the wizard Homnibus. And in this manner, they met a tiny, blue-skinned humanoid creature in white clothing called a "Schtroumpf," followed by his numerous peers who looked just like him, with an elderly leader who wore red clothing and had a white beard called Grand Schtroumpf" (Papa Smurf). The characters proved to be a huge success, and the first independent spin-off Smurf stories appeared in Spirou in 1959, together with the first merchandising.

Volumes
This is the list of the original French-language comic issues. Some of them are anthologies of several stories. A number of them were translated into English by Anthea Bell and Derek Hockridge, and published by Hodder & Stoughton (Random House in the USA). The late comic artist Pascal Garray contributed to seventeen editions of The Smurf comics between 1990 and 2017. Garray's last comic, Les Schtroumpfs et les haricots Mauves, was released in September 2017.

Johan and Peewit appearances
 La flûte à six schtroumpfs (originally titled as La flûte à six trous)
 La guerre des sept fontaines
 Le pays maudit
 Le sortilège de Maltrochu
 La horde du corbeau
 La nuit des sorciers

Original series

Albums made after the death of Peyo, with help from his son Thierry Culliford (born 1956):
 Le Schtroumpfeur de Bijoux (The Jewel Smurfer), Le Lombard, 01/01/1994, 
 Docteur Schtroumpf (Doctor Smurf), Le Lombard, 01/01/1996, 
 Le Schtroumpf Sauvage (The Wild Smurf), Le Lombard, 11/01/1998, 
 La Menace Schtroumpf (Attack of the Grey Smurfs), Le Lombard, 11/01/2000, 
 On ne Schtroumpfe pas le Progrès (You Don't Smurf Progress), Le Lombard, 11/01/2002, 
 Le Schtroumpf Reporter (The Reporter Smurf), Le Lombard, 11/01/2003, 
 Les Schtroumpfs Joueurs (The Gambler Smurfs), Le Lombard, 01/01/2005, 
 Salade de Schtroumpfs (Salad Smurfs), Le Lombard, 01/13/2006, 
 Un Enfant chez les Schtroumpfs (A Child among the Smurfs), Le Lombard, 01/12/2007, 
 Les Schtroumpfs et le livre qui dit tout (The Smurfs and the Book that Tells Everything), Le Lombard, 01/18/2008, 
 Schtroumpfs les bains (Smurfs in Paradise), Le Lombard, 04/3/2009, 
 La Grande Schtroumpfette (The Grand Smurfette), Le Lombard, 04/16/2010, 
 Les Schtroumpfs et l'Arbre d'Or (The Smurfs and the Golden Tree), Le Lombard, 04/08/2011, 
 Les Schtroumpfs de L'Ordre (The Law and Order of The Smurfs), Le Lombard, 03/23/2012, 
 Les Schtroumpfs à Pilulit  (Chicken-Fried Smurfs), Le Lombard, 04/19/2013, 
  Les Schtroumpfs et L'Amour Sorcier (The Smurfs and the Sorcerer's Love), Le Lombard, 04/04/2014, 
  Schtroupf Le Héros (Smurf Heroes), Le Lombard, 03/13/2015, 
  Les Schtroumpfs Et Le Demi-Genie (The Smurfs and the Half-Genie), Le Lombard, 04/01/2016, 
  Les Schtroumpfs Et Les Haricots Mauves (The Smurfs and the Purple Beans), Le Lombard, 08/18/2017, 
  Les Schtroumpfs Et Le Dragon Du Lac (The Smurfs and the Dragon of the Lake), Le Lombard, 03/02/2018, 
  Les Schtroumpfs Et La Machine à Rêver (The Smurfs and the Dream Machine), Le Lombard, 04/05/2019, 
<li>  Les Schtroumpfs et le vol des cigognes, Le Lombard, 2020.
<li>  Les Schtroumpfs et la tempête blanche, Le Lombard, 2021.
<li>  Les Schtroumpfs et les Enfants perdus, Le Lombard, 2022.

Les Schtroumpfs et le Village des Filles (The Smurfs and the Village of Girls)
Albums featuring the Smurfy Grove Smurfs from Smurfs: The Lost Village.
 La Forêt interdite (The Forbidden Forest), Le Lombard, 04/24/2017, 
 La trahison de Bouton d'Or (The Betrayal of Smurfblossom), Le Lombard, 08/24/2018 
 Le Corbeau (Smurfs) (The Raven), Le Lombard, 10/31/2019 
 Un nouveau départ (A New Beginning), Le Lombard, 11/24/2020 
 Le Bâton de saule, Le Lombard, 2022.

Look-In magazine strips
In the 1970s and '80s, the British children's magazine Look-In ran an original series of one-page comic-strip tales called "Meet the Smurfs."

Marvel Comics
In 1982 Marvel Comics released a Three issue mini series featuring full length stories and one page gags featuring The Smurfs. Marvel Comics also published a large format comic book as well as six mini comic books with a full length story in each comic book.

Papercutz graphic novels
Since August 2010, Papercutz has been issuing Smurfs comics, translated by Joe Johnson. Following a special preview comic in July 2010 that contained the story "The Smurfnapper," the following graphic novels have been issued to date:

 The Purple Smurfs (August 31, 2010)
 The Smurfs and the Magic Flute (August 31, 2010)
 King Smurf (November 23, 2010)
 The Smurfette (January 18, 2011)
 The Smurfs and the Egg (March 15, 2011)
 The Smurfs and the Howlibird (May 10, 2011)
 The Astrosmurf (August 2, 2011)
 The Smurf Apprentice (September 27, 2011)
 Gargamel and the Smurfs (November 22, 2011)
 The Return of the Smurfette (January 17, 2012)
 The Smurf Olympics (March 27, 2012)
 Smurf Versus Smurf (August 7, 2012)
 Smurf Soup (November 13, 2012)
 The Baby Smurf (March 5, 2013)
 The Smurflings (May 14, 2013)
 The Aerosmurf (August 6, 2013)
 The Strange Awakening of Lazy Smurf (March 25, 2014)
 The Finance Smurf (July 1, 2014)
 The Jewel Smurfer (August 18, 2015)
 Doctor Smurf (March 1, 2016)
 The Wild Smurf (September 6, 2016)
 The Smurf Menace (January 17, 2017)
 You Can't Smurf Progress (June 6, 2017)
 The Smurf Reporter (September 25, 2018)
 The Gambler Smurfs (2019)
 Smurf Salad (October 8, 2019 )

Other special books:
"Christmas Smurfs"  (October 1, 2013)
"Forever Smurfette"  (November 18, 2014)
"Smurf Monsters" (September 29, 2015)
"The Village Behind the Wall" (March 21, 2017)
 "The Smurfs Special Boxed Set" (April 4, 2017)
Papercutz published "The Smurf Submarine" in Geronimo Stilton & Smurfs for Free Comic Book Day on May 7, 2011.

In popular culture
In the Belgian Comic Strip Center in Brussels the permanent exhibition brings homage to the pioneers of Belgian comics, among them Peyo. In the room dedicated to his work various objects, comic book pages, sketches,... from "The Smurfs" comics can be seen.

The Smurfs are among the many Belgian comics characters to jokingly have a Brussels street named after them. The Rue des Sables/ Zandstraat has a commemorative plaque with the name Rue Schtroumpfs/ Smurfstraat placed under the actual street sign.
Close to the Smurfs studios in Genval (a province of Brabant), a bronze statue of the Smurfs is sited in a traffic circle.
In 2003 a statue of a Smurf building a statue of Smurfette was unveiled in Middelkerke. It was sculpted by Monique Mol.

At the Grasmarkt in Brussels a  statue of a Smurf on a toadstool can be seen. It was sculpted by Maryline Garbe and unveiled on June 25, 2012.

References

External links

The Smurfs official site
Happy Smurfday: Official Smurfs 50th Anniversary site
List of Papercutz Graphic Novels

Belgian comic strips
Belgian comics titles
Belgian comics characters
Lombard Editions titles
The Smurfs
Star Comics titles
Dupuis titles
French-language literature
1958 comics debuts
Comics characters introduced in 1958
Comics by Peyo
Comics set in forests
Comics set in the Middle Ages
Humor comics
Gag-a-day comics
Fantasy comics
Adventure comics
Comics spin-offs
Belgian comics adapted into films
Comics adapted into animated films
Comics adapted into television series
Comics adapted into animated series
Comics adapted into video games
Sony Pictures Animation franchises